Cindy Brooks (born January 9, 1965) is an American rower. In the 1995 World Rowing Championships, she won a gold medal in the women's coxless four event.

References

See also

American female rowers
World Rowing Championships medalists for the United States
Living people
1965 births
21st-century American women